Hani Furstenberg (born September 14) is an Israeli, American actress and singer, perhaps best known in Israel for her work in the films Yossi & Jagger and Campfire, and internationally for her role in The Loneliest Planet.

Early life
Furstenberg was born in Israel to a family of Ashkenazi Jewish descent. She moved to New York City when she was six weeks old and lived there until her family returned to Israel when she was 16.

Career
In Israel, Furstenberg first gained notoriety for her role as Lilach in the TV drama The Bourgeoisie (HaBurganim) and has since starred in numerous Israeli plays and television series, including the second season of False Flag and in the second season of American Gods as the loa, Maman Brigitte, the wife of Baron Samedi from Haitian Vodou.

She made her Broadway debut in December 2014 playing Fraulein Kost in Cabaret.

Furstenberg has become known internationally for her performance in the award-winning film, The Loneliest Planet. In 2019, she starred in Epic Pictures', The Golem.

Personal life
Since 2010, she has resided in the United States with her Israeli husband Ido Heskia, and their daughter.

References

External links
 
  (archive)

1979 births
Living people
Israeli expatriate actresses in the United States
Israeli film actresses
Israeli stage actresses
Israeli television actresses
21st-century Israeli actresses
Beit Zvi School for the Performing Arts alumni
Place of birth missing (living people)
Actresses from New York City
Israeli Ashkenazi Jews
21st-century American women